Living in England EP is an EP by the Australian band The Screaming Jets. The only Extended Play peaked at number 19 on the ARIA Charts.

Track listing

Charts

References

The Screaming Jets albums
1992 EPs
EPs by Australian artists